Munir Ertegun (Turkish spelling: Münir Ertegün; 1883 – 11 November 1944) was a Turkish legal counsel in international law to the "Sublime Porte" (imperial government) of the late Ottoman Empire and a diplomat of the Republic of Turkey during its early years. Ertegun married Emine Hayrünnisa Rüstem in 1917 and the couple had three children, two of whom were Nesuhi and Ahmet Ertegun, the brothers who founded Atlantic Records and became iconic figures in the American music industry.

Life and career

Born in Istanbul to a civil servant father, Mehmet Cemil Bey, and a mother Ayşe Hamide Hanım, who was a daughter of Sufi shaykh İbrahim Edhem Efendi, he studied law at Darülfünûn-u Şahâne (دار الفنون شهانه), now Istanbul University, and graduated in 1908. He was a legal counsel for the Ottoman Ministry of Foreign Affairs, when he saw the birth of his first son, Nesuhi, on 26 November 1917, in Constantinople (now Istanbul), during the First World War. Taking part in an Ottoman delegation with a mission to seek reconciliation with the Nationalists in Ankara, by the end of 1920, changed his destiny. While the two Ottoman ministers heading the delegation returned to Istanbul after not achieving an understanding with the revolutionaries led by Mustafa Kemal Pasha he chose to join the National Struggle and remained in Ankara, leaving behind his young wife and three-year-old son, Nesuhi. He became an aide to Mustafa Kemal during the Turkish War of Independence and the chief legal counsel of the Turkish delegation to the resulting Treaty of Lausanne in 1923.

After the Western powers recognized the newly founded Republic of Turkey in 1923, he was sent to Geneva to the League of Nations as an observer for the Turkish Republic. During this assignment, he frequently went to Paris for the Ottoman public debt negotiations. Following this posting to the League of Nations, he was appointed ambassador to Switzerland (1925–1930), France (1930–1932), the United Kingdom (1932–1934) and the United States (1934–1944). As the Republic's ambassador to Washington, Ertegun opened his embassy's parlors to African American jazz musicians, who gathered there to play freely in a socio-historical context which was deeply divided by racial segregation at the time. Ambassador Ertegun became the Dean of the Diplomatic Corps in May 1944. He held this last post until he died in Washington, D.C., of a heart attack in November of the same year. In April 1946, a year after World War II had ended, his body was carried back to Istanbul by the USS Missouri and buried in the garden of Sufi tekke,  in Sultantepe, Üsküdar. near his shaykh grandfather İbrahim Edhem Efendi, who was once the head of the Tekke. (His two sons Nesuhi and Ahmet Ertegun also rest there.)

When Ertegun died, there was not yet a mosque in Washington, D.C., at which his funeral could be held. The Islamic Center of Washington was built as a result.

See also
 List of Turkish diplomats

References

External links

1883 births
1944 deaths
Diplomats from Istanbul
Lawyers from Istanbul
Istanbul University Faculty of Law alumni
Ambassadors of Turkey to the United Kingdom
Ambassadors of Turkey to the United States
Deans of the Diplomatic Corps to the United States
Ambassadors of Turkey to France
Ambassadors of Turkey to Switzerland
20th-century Turkish diplomats
20th-century Turkish lawyers